Michael "Lloyd" McIver (born 2 March 1986) is a Gaelic footballer who plays for the Derry county team, with whom he won a National League title. McIver plays his club football for Ballinderry Shamrocks, and has won the Derry Senior Football Championship twice with the club.

For both club and county McIver usually plays in half back line, but has also played corner back.

Early life
McIver has been managed by his father Brian in the past.

Football career

Inter-county
McIver represented Derry at Minor and Under 21 level. He was captain of the Under 21 side in 2007. He was first called up to the Derry Senior football panel during the 2007 Championship for cover, but didn't play in any games. He worked his way into the Derry team in the 2008 National League campaign.

He was part of the Derry team that won the 2008 National League, when Derry defeated Kerry in the final. His championship debut came later in 2008 against Donegal, who were ironically managed by his father Brian.

Championship games

Notes:
Under "Result", Derry scoreline is recorded first.

Club
McIver won his first Derry Senior Football Championship in 2006. He won a second Derry Championship medal with Ballinderry in 2008. In both years the club also reached the final of the Ulster Senior Club Football Championship.

Honours

Inter-county
National Football League:
Winner (1): 2008

Club
Ulster Senior Club Football Championship:
Runner up: 2006, 2008
Ulster Senior Club Football League:
Winner (1): 2008
Derry Senior Football Championship:
Winner (2): 2006, 2008
Derry Senior Football League:
Winner (3/4): 2005?, 2006, 2007, 2008
Numerous underage competitions

Individual
Derry Under 21 captain: 2007

References

External links
Player profiles on Official Derry GAA website
Ballinderry Shamrocks GAC website

1986 births
Living people
Ballinderry Gaelic footballers
Derry inter-county Gaelic footballers